Natalya Yevgenyevna Gorbanevskaya (26 May 1936 – 29 November 2013) was a Russian poet, a translator of Polish literature and a civil-rights activist. She was one of the founders and the first editor of A Chronicle of Current Events (1968–1982). On 25 August 1968, with seven others, she took part in the 1968 Red Square demonstration against the Soviet invasion of Czechoslovakia. In 1970 a Soviet court sentenced Gorbanevskaya to incarceration in a psychiatric hospital. She was released from the Kazan Special Psychiatric Hospital in 1972, and emigrated from the USSR in 1975, settling in France. In 2005, she became a citizen of Poland.

Life in Moscow 
Gorbanevskaya was born in Moscow. She graduated from Leningrad University in 1964 and became a technical editor and translator. Only nine of her poems had been published in official journals by the time she quit the USSR in 1975; the rest circulated privately (samizdat) or were published abroad (tamizdat).

Dissident activities

From 1968 onwards Gorbanevskaya was active in what was later called the Soviet "dissident movement."

She was founder and first editor of A Chronicle of Current Events, a samizdat publication that focused on the violation of basic human rights in the Soviet Union. Her contribution was to compile and edit the reports, and then type the first six carbon copies of the issue, the "zero-generation" copy, for further replication and distribution.

Gorbanevskaya was also one of eight protesters in the 25 August 1968 Red Square demonstration against the Soviet invasion of Czechoslovakia. Having recently given birth, she was not immediately tried with the other demonstrators.  She used this time to follow the trial in the Chronicle of Current Events, and published the accumulated documentation abroad in French and Russian (Polden). The book appeared in English in 1972 as Red Square at Noon.

In 1969, she signed An Appeal to The UN Committee for Human Rights.

In December 1969 Gorbanevskaya was arrested. In July the following year she was put on trial and found guilty of offences under Article 190-1 of the RSFSR Criminal Code, committed while of unsound mind. Gorbanevskaya was sentenced to indefinite confinement in a psychiatric hospital where she would be treated for "sluggish schizophrenia", a diagnosis commonly applied to dissidents. Gorbanevskaya was released from the Kazan Special Psychiatric Hospital in February 1972.

Life in emigration

In December 1975, Gorbanevskaya emigrated to Paris. There, French psychiatrists at their request examined Gorbanevskaya and found her to be mentally normal. They concluded that in 1969–72 she had been committed to a psychiatric hospital for political, not medical reasons.

For a time Gorbanevskaya was a celebrity figure in the West. In 1976 Joan Baez released a song dedicated to Gorbanevskaya called "Natalia", written by Roy Apps, Shusha Guppy and G.T. Moore, on the live album From Every Stage. Introducing the song, Baez criticized Gorbanevskaya's internment in the psychiatric hospital and said: "It is because of people like Natalya Gorbanevskaya, I am convinced, that you and I are still alive and walking around on the face of the earth."

Adrienne Rich also wrote "For a Sister," from the book Diving into the Wreck: Poems 1971–1972, in acknowledgement of Gorbanevskaya and other women and their wrongful imprisonment.

For thirty years, however, Gorbanevskaya was stateless until Poland granted her citizenship in 2005.

In 2005 Gorbanevskaya took part in They Chose Freedom, a four-part television documentary on the history of the Soviet dissident movement directed by Vladimir Kara-Murza Jr.

In 2008, she was a signatory of the Prague Declaration on European Conscience and Communism.

On 29 November 2013, Gorbanevskaya died in her house in Paris.

Commemoration rally on Red Square, 2013

In August 2013, Gorbanevskaya participated in a rally in Moscow to commemorate the forty-fifth anniversary of the invasion of Czechoslovakia. The rally was quickly dispersed by police, and ten participants (but not Gorbanevskaya) were taken into custody. They were released after international protests, especially from the Czech Republic.

Awards 
In 2008, October, Gorbanevskaya received Poland's Marie Curie Award. The same year, Gorbanevskaya was nominated for the Angelus Central European Literature Award.

On 22 October 2013 Gorbanevskaya received an honorary medal from Charles University in Prague for her lifelong commitment to the struggle for democracy, freedom and human rights.
 
On 27 October 2014 Gorbanevskaya was awarded posthumously the highest Slovak award, the Order of the White Double Cross, for her lifelong efforts to defend democracy and human rights.

Books and other publications

See also
 Chronicle of Current Events
 samizdat
 1968 Red Square demonstration

References

External links

Links in English
  (English translation from a review, published in Novy Mir, No.7, 1997, p. 67–68).
 
 
 
 
 
 
10 poems by Natalya Gorbanevskaya: Audio of her own reading with text translations into different languages
Poems and texts by Gorbanevskaya at Prague Writers' Festival

Links in Russian

List of publications
Photographs and biography
Биография
 Наталья Горбаневская. Что помню я о демонстрации
Информация о демонстрации в бюллетене «Хроника текущих событий» 
Информация о суде над демонстрантами в бюллетене «Хроника текущих событий» 
https://web.archive.org/web/20071012132901/http://yale.edu/annals/sakharov/documents_frames/Sakharov_008.htm; Письмо Андропова в ЦК про демонстрацию (windows encoding)
  

1936 births
2013 deaths
Writers from Moscow
Saint Petersburg State University alumni
Russian women poets
Soviet women poets
Soviet poets
Soviet dissidents
Soviet psychiatric abuse whistleblowers
Psychiatric survivor activists
Russian activists
Russian women activists
Soviet translators
Soviet emigrants to France
20th-century Russian women writers
20th-century Russian translators
20th-century Russian writers
Russian memoirists
People associated with the magazine "Kultura"

Women memoirists